Digitivalva peyrierasi is a moth of the family Acrolepiidae. It is known from Africa.

References

Acrolepiidae
Moths described in 1987